Marienburg may refer to:

Historical German names
Ordensburg Marienburg (Malbork Castle), the large brick castle built by the Teutonic Knights
Malbork, Poland, the site of the Ordensburg Marienburg, formerly Marienburg (Royal Prussia/Crown of the Kingdom of Poland 1466-1772)
Alūksne, Latvia
Feldioara, Romania

Places

Germany
 Marienburg Castle (Ostalbkreis), a castle in Niederalfingen near Aalen, Germany
 Marienburg Castle (Hanover), a castle in Hanover district, residence of the Prince of Hanover
 Marienburg Castle (Hildesheim), a castle in Hildesheim, Lower Saxony
 Köln-Marienburg, a district of Rodenkirchen in the city of Cologne
 A former castle and monastery on the River Moselle
 Marienburg Airport (currently a park), an airport in Nuremberg before the construction of the Nuremberg Airport

Elsewhere
 Marienburg, Papua New Guinea, a town in the East Sepik province
 Marienburg, Suriname, a village and former sugar plantation

Fictional places
Marienburg (Warhammer), a fictional city in the Warhammer Fantasy world

See also
 Siege of Marienburg (disambiguation)
 Treaty of Marienburg
 Marienberg (disambiguation)
 Marienborg, the summer residence of Denmark's Prime Minister